32 may refer to: 

 32 (number), the natural number following 31 and preceding 33
 one of the years 32 BC, AD 32, 1832, 1932, 2032

Music
 The shortened pseudonym of UK rapper Wretch 32
 ThirtyTwo (album), a 2014 album by Reverend and The Makers

Songs
 "32" (song), a 2013 single from the Carpark North album Phoenix
 "32", a song on Mr. Mister's debut album I Wear the Face
 "Thirty Two", a 1967 song by Van Morrison from New York Sessions '67
 "The Chamber of 32 Doors", a 1974 song by Genesis from The Lamb Lies Down on Broadway
 "Thirty Two", a song by Karma to Burn from the album Wild, Wonderful Purgatory, 1999

Other uses
 .32 caliber, a family of firearm cartridges
 .32 ACP, a handgun cartridge
 Highway 32
 ThirtyTwo, snowboarding brand owned by Sole Technology
 32 Gloucester–Ross-on-Wye, a bus route in England

See also

 
 
 
 
 
 
 Germanium (Ge) element 32
 
 
 
 
 Type 032 (disambiguation)
 Channel 32 (disambiguation)
 Route 32 (disambiguation)
 List of highways numbered 32